Mallı-Şıxlı is a municipality in the Goychay Rayon of central Azerbaijan. It has a population of 1,870.  The municipality consists of the villages of Mallı, Şıxlı, and Ərəbşahverdi.

References

Populated places in Goychay District